The People's Liberation Movement may refer to:

 People's Liberation Movement-Chinchoneros
 People's Liberation Movement (El Salvador)
 People's Liberation Movement (Montserrat)
 People's Liberation Movement (Saint Vincent and the Grenadines)
 Yugoslav Partisans, sometimes referred to as the People's Liberation Movement
 Croatian Partisans, sometimes referred to as the People's Liberation Movement